Emmanuel Ngudikama (born 7 September 1987) is a Congolese football midfielder.

References

1987 births
Living people
Democratic Republic of the Congo footballers
Democratic Republic of the Congo international footballers
AS Vita Club players
C.D. Primeiro de Agosto players
Association football midfielders
Democratic Republic of the Congo expatriate footballers
Expatriate footballers in Angola
Democratic Republic of the Congo expatriate sportspeople in Angola
21st-century Democratic Republic of the Congo people
Democratic Republic of the Congo A' international footballers
2011 African Nations Championship players
2016 African Nations Championship players